Veronique Thouvenot is a Chilean scientist, medical doctor and co-founder of Fundación Millenia2025 focused on women empowerment and equality. She was named in the BBC 100 Women (inspiring and influential women from around the world) in 2019.

Early life and career 
Thouvenot was born in Concepción, Chile. She moved to Sweden where she started her medical practice. Thouvenot along with Jordi Serrano Pons and Coumba Touré founded Fundación Millenia2025 which is focused on empowering women. At the United Nations General Assembly (UNGA) in 2014, their foundation launched "Zero Mothers Die" maternal health app and provided women with mobile phones to access the app for information on pregnancies available in eight languages for free. She sees technology as a way to reduce the very high number of fatalities due to childbirth.

She was named in the BBC 100 Women (inspiring and influential women from around the world) in 2019 for her work in maternal health.

References 

Chilean women scientists
Living people
People from Concepción, Chile
BBC 100 Women
1957 births
Chilean scientists
Chilean physicians